Marseille Vitrolles Rugby is a French rugby union club based in Marseille and currently competing in Fédérale 1, the semi-professional top level of the French amateur league system. The club, founded in 2007 by a merger of Marseille Provence XV and Vitrolles de Rugby à XV, plays at Marseille Provence's former home ground, Stade Roger Couderc.

The club debuted in Fédérale 2 in 2007–08, and earned promotion to Fédérale 1 at their first attempt.  They currently remain in Fédérale 1, but showed their ambition to reach the French professional leagues by signing former All Black and International Rugby Hall of Fame Jonah Lomu to a contract for the 2009–10 season.

Famous players
 Jonah Lomu

Transfers

Out for 2014-2015
  Dominique Cazian (to Saint Petersburg Pioneers)

See also
List of rugby union clubs in France

External links
Official website

2007 establishments in France
French rugby union clubs
Rugby clubs established in 2007
Sport in Marseille